The Kyocera E3100, often referred to as the Kyocera Rio, is a touch slate phone from Kyocera with MP3 music player. It was announced at the 2010 CTIA show, where it was said that the launch operator would be Cricket in the USA. Movilnet launched It in the Venezuelan market. Features include:
LCD resistive touch color display - 240 x 320 pixels - 2.8"
Web access: WAP 2.0 Browser 
GPS Locator
Stereo Bluetooth
MicroSD card
Voice activated dialing

Other technical data:
Battery Life: Talk: up to 5.5 hours, Standby: up to 336 hours

Carriers
Cricket Wireless (discontinued)
Mobi (discontinued)
Movilnet (discontinued)

References

Kyocera mobile phones